The academic halls of the University of Oxford were educational institutions within the university. The principal difference between a college and a hall was that whereas the former are governed by the fellows of the college, the halls were governed by their principals. Of over a hundred halls in the Middle Ages, only St Edmund Hall survived into the mid-20th century, becoming a college in 1957.

History

Middle Ages
Historians believe that by the beginning of the 13th Century Oxford's student population exceeded fifteen hundred and was equal in size to the town's non-student population. Throughout this period, students and their masters lived either as lodgers or as private tenants in accommodation owned by the townsfolk. The students and their masters depended on the townsfolk for their basic needs, namely food and accommodation. Essentially, half of Oxford's population were consumers only, leaving the other half of the town's population to profit from them.

At this point in time, the nascent university owned no buildings. Like in Europe's other fledgling University, Paris, a rudimentary body of masters existed to regulate professional matters of mutual concern and masters were responsible for renting suitable premises for their lectures. Oxford's informal association of masters had no real authority and relied upon its members' clerical status and prestige for protection. Unsurprisingly, the association of masters was unable to curb the behaviour of the unsupervised hordes of students taking up residence in Oxford. The ongoing feuds between the university cohort and the townsfolk threatened the existence of higher education in Oxford. To counter this threat, the masters sought to combat the public disorder by curbing profiteering by the townspeople as landlords and tradespeople and reining in the student's freedoms.  These attempts led to the gradual introduction of academic halls as the officially recognised accommodation for students.

Student housing was regulated as early as 1214, when a papal legate issued an ordinance to resolve a dispute over two clerks who had been hanged by townspeople. The rent of all "hospitia [houses] let to clerks" was to be halved for ten years. These hospitia developed into the medieval academic halls. A typical hall would have been a house with a narrow street frontage consisting of a single-storey communal hall and smaller rooms for students, two to four to a room. Later in the 13th century the first colleges were founded: University (1249), Balliol (1263) and Merton (1264). 

The religious privileges enjoyed by students and masters and the presence of so many clerks lead to jurisdictional disputes between the university's attendees and the townsfolk. Moreover, differences between academics related to England's north south divide and an influx of poorly behaved young students with no higher authority to answer to made Thirteenth-Century Oxford a volatile place.

The earliest colleges were intended for graduates; however New College (1379) admitted undergraduates from the beginning, and from that time colleges increasingly competed with the halls. The colleges had statutes and an endowment to ensure their permanence, whereas the halls depended on the ability and resources of their principals.

In around 1413 the university issued a statute requiring all academics to live in colleges or halls. This was followed by a royal ordinance in 1420 requiring students to swear to obey the university statutes, be governed by a principal and not live in private houses. In 1483–90 the university issued the first aularian statutes (from aula, the Latin for "hall") to regulate the halls.

Later
In 1603 only eight Oxford halls survived, and by 1842 five, as Broadgates, Gloucester and Hart had become colleges. Their principals were chosen by the chancellor of the university, except for St Edmund Hall, where the provost of Queen's College made the appointment. In the 19th century the halls were able to offer a less expensive education than the colleges; however this advantage was removed by the admission of unattached students, who could live in lodgings, in 1868 and the opening of Keble in 1870.

In 1877 Prime Minister Disraeli appointed commissioners under Lord Selborne and later Mountague Bernard to consider and implement reform of the university and its colleges. The commissioners came to the view that the four remaining medieval halls were not viable and should merge with colleges on the death or resignation of the incumbent principals. In 1881, the commissioners issued University Statutes which provided for St Alban to merge with Merton, St Mary with Oriel, New Inn with Balliol and for a partial merger of St Edmund with Queen's. 

In 1903 only St Edmund Hall remained. Principal Edward Moore wished to retire and become a resident canon in Canterbury Cathedral. Queen's College proposed an amended statute for complete rather than partial merger, which was rejected by Congregation. In 1912 a statute was passed preserving the independence of the hall, which enabled Moore to retire. In 1957 St Edmund Hall became a college, keeping its old name as the last surviving academic hall.

List of academic halls in 1600

See also
Private halls of the University of Oxford
Permanent private hall

References

Sources 
Books

 
 

History of the University of Oxford